Olinda Joy Elisabeth Castielle (born Olinda Borggren, September 30, 1976) is a Swedish television personality who was a contestant on the American reality show Joe Millionaire and on the first season of the Swedish version of Paradise Hotel.

Biography

Swedish television 
In 2005 Olinda was a contestant on the Swedish version of Paradise Hotel which was broadcast on TV4, where she fast became the most notable contestant of the season. Being eliminated twice but still re-instated by the producers of the show in different ways. In the end, Castielle managed to make it to the final week. She became the most hated contestant of the season from fellow contestants but also managed to get a huge fanbase from the Swedish viewers.

She became romantically involved with another contestant on Paradise Hotel, Patrick Michael Castielle. The two were featured in two new specials on TV4's sister channel TV400 after their Paradise Hotel visit.

One special was The OP Tour; in it, the duo showed how their music show was produced, travelled all over Sweden, and Castielle sang her single "Playboy Bunny," It was released in Europe and became a big hit in several countries. The song was the world's most popular mobile signal in 2005. In Sweden, it was awarded with mobile operator 3 's gold mobile most downloaded song.

Their next show was Little Italy, in which the duo went to Italy and met with different Italian celebrities, such as the football player Maldini. The show aired on TV400.

The Castielle's have also been hosts for the talk show Paradise Hotel Extra, for the cast members of season two.

American television 
Castielle appeared in the second season of the American reality show Joe Millionaire titled The Next Joe Millionaire in 2003, where she was cast as one of the women who competed for Joe named David Smith. Olinda was eliminated in the fifth episode, but still remained one of the most talked about contestants being labelled the villain of the season, Castielle moved back home to Sweden after the show ended, and was quickly cast for Paradise Hotel.

Other ventures

Hard Ass Candy
Castielle is a painter who creates provocative and morbid art. She created her first collection Hard Ass Candy, that was to be exhibited in Stockholm, Los Angeles and NYC in 2013.

TV shows 
Paradise Hotel (Swedish Edition)
Paradise Hotel Extra (season 1 as a guest)
Paradise Hotel Extra (season 2 as a host)
Joe Millionaire (USA edition)
The OP Tour
Little Italy

References

Participants in American reality television series
Swedish television personalities
Swedish women television presenters
Swedish television talk show hosts
Living people
1976 births
21st-century Swedish singers
21st-century Swedish women singers